Coxhoe Bridge railway station served the village of Coxhoe, County Durham, England, from 1846 to 1984 on the Hartlepool–Ferryhill Line.

History 
The station opened on 12 August 1846 by the York and Newcastle Railway. It was known as Coxhoe in Bradshaw but Bridge was added in 1860. It closed to passengers on 9 June 1952 but goods continued to serve Coxhoe Quarry until 9 June 1984.

References

External links 

Disused railway stations in County Durham
Railway stations opened in 1846
Railway stations closed in 1952
1846 establishments in England
1984 disestablishments in England

Railway stations in Great Britain opened in 1846